Portuguese Flat was a California mining camp of the early 1850s during the California Gold Rush, consisting largely of Portuguese miners. It was located about 35 miles north of Redding, California near what is currently now the unincorporated community of Pollard Flat. It is in the ZIP code area of 96051 and the area code 530.

History
Arising along the route of the Siskiyou Trail, Portuguese Flat, with its rich diggings, gained the reputation of being one of the roughest camps in northern Shasta County; it was also known as a "squaw town" because of the number of Native American women present in the town. By the time of the 1885 census, it appears that the site was deserted.

As late as 1933, just north of Pollard's Gulch on what is now Interstate 5, one could see a few old tumbledown buildings, one ancient log cabin, and some veteran apple trees — all that remained of Portuguese Flat. Pioneers Ross McCloud and Mary Campbell McCloud operated an inn in Portuguese Flat from approximately 1853–5 (before going on to operate the inn at Upper Soda Springs).

In the story of the famous "Battle of Castle Crags" (which took place in 1855), a young Joaquin Miller tells a dramatic tale of being seriously wounded, by having an arrow shot through his jaw and neck.  Miller was taken to the Portuguese Flat inn operated by the McClouds to recuperate, and was nursed to health by Mary Campbell McCloud.

Politics
In the state legislature Pollard Flat is in the 4th Senate District, represented by Republican Doug LaMalfa, and in the 2nd Assembly District, represented by Republican Jim Nielsen.

References

 Reference by Joaquin Miller to Portuguese Flat
 Joaquin Miller chronology mention of Castle Crags
 Joaquin Miller tended by Mary Campbell McCloud
 Portuguese Flat deserted by 1885 Census

External links
 Museum of the Siskiyou Trail
 History of Portuguese Settlement in the Sacramento Valley

Former settlements in Shasta County, California
History of Shasta County, California
Mining communities of the California Gold Rush
Portuguese-American culture in California
Former populated places in California